Andrew Darroh Sudderth is the former lead singer for the alternative metal band Fair to Midland, from Sulphur Springs, Texas.

Fair to Midland

Beginnings 

In 1998, Andrew formed Fair to Midland along with friends Cliff Campbell, Jason Pintler, and Nathin Seals while on his senior year at Sulphur Springs High School. He joined as the bass guitar player, but eventually took over lead vocals when Nathin Seals joined the band.

Sudderth is known for an enthusiastic stage presence, including wild dancing and leaping, and occasionally even climbing various parts of the stage, as well as his large vocal range, spanning the gap from guttural growls to crooning falsetto, and use of throat singing as demonstrated in "Dance of the Manatee" and "Rikki Tikki Tavi".

Discography
Darroh Sudderth has released four studio albums and one extended play as lead singer of Fair to Midland. He also provided backing vocals on South FM's song "Regret/The Grieving" from their release Swallowing the Pill.  In 2009 Sudderth provided vocals on the tracks "Look," "Stars" and "Time Is Nothing" from Resident Hero's album Look. He also provided background vocals on the track "Red Shelter" from Moving Atlas' Red Shelter EP.

Studio albums

With Fair to Midland

Extended plays

References

External links
Band's Myspace

American heavy metal singers
Singers from Texas
Living people
1981 births
People from Sulphur Springs, Texas
21st-century American singers